This page describes the qualifying procedure for the 2011 Individual Long Track World Championship finals.

Heat details

Qualification Round One 
29 May 2010
 Les Artigues-de-Lussac, Gironde
Aérodrome de Libourne (Length: 49O m)
Referee:  Istvan Darago
Jury President:  Ilkka Teromaa
References 
Changes:
Draw 1.  → 
Draw 7.  →  Paul Cooper → Perry
Draw 3.  Henry Van Der Steen → Reserve 19. Dubernard

Qualification Round Two 
31 July 2010
 Wertle
“Hümmlingring Arena” (Length: 541 m)
Referee:  Wojciech Grodzki
Jury President:  Christian Bouin
References 
Changes:
Draw 8.  →

Long Track Challenge 
25 September 2010
 Forssa, Tavastia Proper
Pilvenmäki (trotting track) (Length: 1.000 m)
Referee:  Thierry Bouin
Jury President:  Anthony Noel
References 
Qualified riders:
The 12 top placed riders from the Qualification rounds. If a rider is not able to take part in the Long Track Challenge, he will be replaced by the next placed rider from his last Qualification Meeting.
Riders placed eight to thirteen from the 2010 World Championship final classification. If a rider is not able to take part in the Long Track Challenge, he will be replaced by the next placed rider on the Final Classification list.
Track reserve riders: Two riders nominated by the host national federation.
Changes:
 from QR One:
 Maxime Mazeau (4th)
 from QR Two:
 Paul Cooper
 from Grand Prix:
 Enrico Janoschka (11th)
 Gerd Riss (13th)

See also 
 2010 Individual Long Track World Championship
 2011 Speedway Grand Prix Qualification

References 

Individual
Qualification for sports events
Individual